Santiago Beitia (born 28 December 1938) is a Spanish rower. He competed in the men's eight event at the 1960 Summer Olympics.

References

1938 births
Living people
Spanish male rowers
Olympic rowers of Spain
Rowers at the 1960 Summer Olympics
Sportspeople from San Sebastián
Rowers from the Basque Country (autonomous community)